In aviation, a ski-jump is an upward-curved ramp that allows aircraft to take off from a runway that is shorter than the aircraft's required takeoff roll. By forcing the aircraft upwards, lift-off can be achieved at a lower airspeed than that required for sustained flight, while allowing the aircraft to accelerate to such speed in the air rather than on the runway. Ski-jumps are commonly used to launch airplanes from aircraft carriers that lack catapults.

During the Cold War era, the concept was studied as a means of reducing the length of flight decks required for future aircraft carriers as well as to facilitate ever-increasingly heavy aircraft at sea.

Having proven its operational value, numerous naval services have adopted the ski-jump for their own aircraft carriers and amphibious assault platforms, while land-based uses have been examined as well. Ski-jump can be used in two different approaches, these being the Short Take-Off But Arrested Recovery (STOBAR) and the Short Take-Off, Vertical Landing aircraft (STOVL); these pertain to the operation of conventional and VSTOL aircraft respectively. Catapult-equipped aircraft carriers have become a minority in the twenty-first century in part due to the decreased cost and complexity of ski-jump operations.

Principle 

A fixed-wing aircraft must build up forward speed during a lengthy takeoff roll. As the forward velocity increases, the wings produce greater amounts of lift. At a high enough speed, the lift force will exceed the weight of the aircraft, and the aircraft will become capable of sustained flight. Since the aircraft must reach flight speed using only its own engines for power, a long runway is required so that the aircraft can build up speed. On an aircraft carrier, the flight deck is so short that most aircraft cannot reach flight speed before reaching the end of the deck. Since lift is less than gravity, the aircraft will lose altitude after the wheels leave the flight deck and possibly fall into the sea.

A ski-jump ramp at the end of the flight deck redirects the aircraft to a slight upward angle, converting part of the aircraft's forward motion into a positive rate of climb. Since the aircraft is still traveling at an inadequate speed to generate enough lift, its climb rate will start to drop as soon as it leaves the flight deck. However, the ski-jump launch has given the aircraft additional time to continue accelerating. By the time its upward velocity has decayed to zero, the aircraft will be going fast enough for its wings to produce enough lift. At this point, the aircraft will be in stable flight, having launched from the carrier without ever dipping below the height of the flight deck.

Many modern aircraft carriers lack catapults, so heavy aircraft must take off using their own engines. Ski-jumps make it possible for heavier aircraft to take off than a horizontal deck allows. However, ski-jump launches cannot match the payloads made possible by high-speed catapult launches. While aircraft such as the F/A 18 that are normally catapult-launched can make use of a ski-ramp, this typically comes at the cost of a reduced capacity for either fuel or munitions, and thus negatively impacting mission scope significantly.

History 

Early aircraft carriers could launch aircraft simply by turning into the wind and adding the ship's own speed to the airspeed experienced by the aircraft. During World War II, carrier aircraft became so heavy that assisted take-off became desirable. Deck catapults were used to accelerate aircraft to takeoff speed, especially when launching heavy aircraft or when it was inconvenient to change course. An early use of the ski-jump occurred in 1944, when the British aircraft carrier  launched a strike against the German battleship . A relatively crude ski-jump ramp was temporarily installed on the end of the flight deck, which helped the heavily bomb-laden Fairey Barracudas take off.

In the years following the Second World War, the prevailing trend of increasingly heavy carrier aircraft continued apace, leading to fears that eventually such increases would exceed the viable payload capabilities of any catapult system. Accordingly, research into alternative methods of assisting takeoff was conducted. A NACA study completed in 1952 proposed the use of a ski-jump following after the aircraft catapult to provide additional assistance to departing aircraft.

In his 1973 M.Phil. thesis, Lt. Cdr. D.R. Taylor of Britain's Royal Navy proposed the use of a ski-jump to help the Harrier jump jet take off. His ski-jump design, which featured a curve, was initially met with scepticism, but other officials endorsed trials of the proposal. Thus, initial testing using various ramp angles was carried out at RAE Bedford; the aircraft used was the two-seat Harrier demonstrator G-VTOL. The results were further verified via computer modelling techniques and simulations. These tests demonstrated that performance increased with ski-jump angle, but planners chose to select the minimum angle, allegedly the reasoning behind this choice was to avoid placing excessive stress on the aircraft's undercarriage.

During the 1970s, the Royal Navy was considering the construction of a through-deck cruiser or light aircraft carrier, and decided to integrate the ski-jump into the project. Accordingly, the  aircraft carriers were constructed with ski-jumps, greatly shortening the distance required for Harriers to take-off even when burdened with a useful payload. The ski-jump proved to be a relatively cheap and straightforward addition to the carriers, comprising steel construction without any moving parts. A ski-jump was added to the first carrier of the type, while she was fitting out in Barrow; it was set at a conservative 7º angle. On 30 October 1980, test pilot Lt Cdr David Poole conducted the first ski-jump assisted Harrier take-off at sea.  was also initially fitted with a 7º ramp; however, was built with a 12º ramp from the outset, which was determined to be the optimum angle. The earlier two ships were subsequently retrofitted with 12º ramps to improve their aircraft's performance.

After the success of the Harrier, the ski-jump became a proven method for launching aircraft from ships without the complexity and expense of a catapult. Furthermore, later models of ski-jump feature refinements over the original design; it was determined that even relatively minor ruts or imperfections on an otherwise absolutely smooth surface were sufficient to precipitate cracking in an aircraft's landing gear. It is for this reason that the Royal Navy implemented more stringent design tolerances in the ramp specifications of the s. It is possible for a modern ski-jump to be built as a single removable structure placed upon the forward flight deck, rather than being fully integrated into a ship's bow.

Ski-jumps were added not only to aircraft carriers, but also to numerous amphibious assault ships and landing helicopter docks to better facilitate the operation of STOVL aircraft. The Australian and Spanish Juan Carlos-class landing helicopter docks (LHDs) have also been outfitted with ski-jumps to facilitate potential STOVL operations. Somewhat unusually, the United States Navy has not ever used ski ramps onboard its amphibious assault ships, despite them being heavily used by VSTOL aircraft such as multiple models of the Harrier jump jet and Lockheed Martin F-35B Lightning IIs; this has been stated to be due to their operations involving combined use of helicopters and boats.

By the start of the twenty-first century, the British, Chinese, Indian, Italian, Russian, Spanish, and Thai navies all possessed aircraft carriers equipped with ski-ramps. Following the retirement of the Brazilian aircraft carrier  during 2017, the United States and France were the only two countries that still operated aircraft carriers with catapults.

Aircraft carrier operations

STOBAR 

On Short Take-Off But Arrested Recovery aircraft carriers (STOBAR), conventional aircraft are launched using a ski-jump. The pilot increases the aircraft's thrust by switching on the afterburners, while holding the plane by braking. Two panels are raised from the deck of the aircraft carrier in front of the aircraft's main landing gear, ensuring the plane remains motionless. Upon command, the pilot releases the brake; the panels from the deck drop back into their slots; and the aircraft rapidly taxis forward under maximum thrust. Rolling over the ski ramp launches the plane both upward and forward.

With the exception of the United States and France, every navy in the world that currently operates naval fixed-wing aircraft from carriers uses ski-jump ramps.

STOVL 

Short Take-Off, Vertical Landing aircraft (STOVL) make a conventional rolling takeoff, with the jet exhausts set to provide maximum forward thrust. As the plane nears the ski-jump ramp, the jet exhausts are rotated to provide lift as well as forward thrust. Such takeoffs allow a larger takeoff weight than an unassisted horizontal launch, because the ski-jump ramp provides a vertical impetus when most needed, right at takeoff at the slowest takeoff speed.

Ski-jump ramp takeoffs are considered to be safer than takeoffs over a flat-top carrier. It might not have a positive rate of climb, especially if the ship had pitched nose down during the takeoff roll.

It was found that takeoff conditions which would use all  of a 's flight deck would only take  with the Asturias's 12° ski-jump ramp; this dramatic improvement for a ship without catapults was described as "nothing short of amazing."

Land operations 

During the early 1990s, the United States Air Force examined the use of ski-jumps on land to enable short-field takeoffs; the approach was viewed as "a possible solution to the runway denial problem in Europe" during the Cold War. It was determined that, when using a ski-jump with a nine degree angle of departure, the distance required for an McDonnell Douglas F/A-18 Hornet to takeoff would be reduced by roughly half.

Ships/classes with ski-jumps

 Anadolu (Turkey)
 Canberra-class landing helicopter docks (Australia)
 Cavour (Italy)
 Chakri Naruebet (Thailand)
 Giuseppe Garibaldi (Italy)
 Hermes/Viraat (UK/India)
 Invincible-class aircraft carriers (UK)
 Juan Carlos I (Spain)
 Kuznetsov-class aircraft carriers (Soviet Union/Russia/China)
 Príncipe de Asturias (Spain)
 Queen Elizabeth-class aircraft carrier (UK)
 Liaoning (China)
 Shandong (China)
 Trieste (Italy)
 Vikramaditya (India)
 Vikrant (R11) (India)

References

Citations

Bibliography

External links

 The Ski Jump: Continuing the UK’s Legacy of Carrier Strike Capability
 Schematic of carrier-based aircraft ski-jump takeoff via researchgate.net
 These graphics show the crucial differences between the world's 3 types of aircraft carrier via businessinsider.com

Naval aviation technology
Aircraft carriers
British inventions